Talal Mansour Al-Rahim (born May 8, 1964) is a retired Qatari sprinter who competed mainly in the 100 metres. He holds the Asian indoor record for 60 metres with 6.51 seconds.

Early life and career
Mansour was born in Qatar's capital city, Doha. His parents were nomads who had emigrated to Doha from the Rub' al Khali desert. He received limited education and as a result of few employment opportunities he joined the Qatar Armed Forces when he was 17 years old. From a young age, he participated in basketball, swimming and athletics. In 1983, when he was 19 years old, his coach Uli Kunst encouraged him to focus solely on athletics. Initially a high jumper, he adapted into a sprinter under Kunst's guidance.

He participated in the 1985 Asian Athletics Championships, finishing in 4th place in the 100 metres category. Consequently, he received little recognition for his accolade at the time, having been overshadowed by the top 3 contenders.

In the 1986 Asian Games, he achieved a gold medal. During the tournament, most of the media initially centered on Zheng Chen, the Asian record holder at the time. However, Mansour's high knee-lift and power running technique impressed many spectators. He knocked off Anat Ratanapol in the semi-finals, clocking a time of 10.32. He clocked a time of 10.30 in the final, and may have had a possibility of surpassing the Asian record at the time had he not decided to play to the audience by raising his arms in triumph before he hit the tape.

He set an Asian record in the 60 metre sprint on 3 March 1993 in the annual LBBW Meeting where he clocked a time of 6.51. He also received a bronze medal in the men's 60 metre sprint at the 1993 IAAF World Indoor Championships, making him the first sprinter from Qatar to win a medal in global athletics.

After retiring from athletics, he was installed as a member of the board of directors of Al Sadd Sports Club.

Achievements
1994 Asian Games - gold medal (200 metres)
1994 Asian Games - gold medal
1993 IAAF World Indoor Championships - bronze medal
1993 Asian Athletics Championships - gold medal
1992 Pan Arab Games - gold medal (200 m)
1992 Pan Arab Games - gold medal
1991 Asian Athletics Championships - gold medal
1990 Asian Games - gold medal
1987 Asian Athletics Championships - gold medal (200 m)
1987 Asian Athletics Championships - gold medal
1986 Asian Games - gold medal

References

External links
Sports Reference
Gulf Cooperation Council Championships
Asian Championships

1964 births
Living people
Qatari male sprinters
Athletes (track and field) at the 1984 Summer Olympics
Athletes (track and field) at the 1988 Summer Olympics
Athletes (track and field) at the 1992 Summer Olympics
Olympic athletes of Qatar
World Athletics Indoor Championships medalists
Asian Games medalists in athletics (track and field)
Athletes (track and field) at the 1986 Asian Games
Athletes (track and field) at the 1990 Asian Games
Athletes (track and field) at the 1994 Asian Games
Asian Games gold medalists for Qatar
Asian Games bronze medalists for Qatar
Medalists at the 1986 Asian Games
Medalists at the 1990 Asian Games
Medalists at the 1994 Asian Games